Yixian Elevated Road is an elevated expressway in the city of Shanghai, China. It runs from the Inner Ring Road at the Dabaishu Interchange to the S20 Outer Ring Expressway and G1503 Shanghai Ring Expressway in Baoshan District.

The first phase of the Yixian Elevated Road ran from the Inner Ring Road to Jungong Road only. The elevated expressway was extended in a second phase to Baoshan District and the S20 Outer Ring Expressway. This opened on 6 July 2004 and shortened the commute from Baoshan District to Dabaishu from 30 to 10 minutes.

The expressway is named after Sun Yat-sen.

Exit List

 Zhongshan N 2nd Rd (Northbound entrance and Southbound exit)
 Middle Ring Road CW (No SB entrance)
 Middle Ring Road CCW (NB entrance and SB exit)
 Wan'an Rd, Changzhong Rd, Zhengli Rd
 Ying'ao W Rd, Ying'ao Rd, Gaoyi Rd
 Changyi Rd (SB entrance only)
 Jungong Rd (No NB exit)
 Changjiang Rd W (Exit only)
 Taihe Ave (NB exit only)
 S20 Outer Ring Expressway CW (NB entrance and exit)
 S20 Outer Ring Expressway CCW (SB entrance and exit)
 Songbin Rd (SB entrance and exit)
Continues as G1503 Shanghai Ring Expressway

References 

Road transport in Shanghai